Cirratulidae is a family of marine polychaete worms. Members of the family are found worldwide, mostly living in mud or rock crevices. Most are deposit feeders, but some graze on algae or are suspension feeders.

Description
Cirratulids vary in size from one to twenty centimetres long. They are mostly burrowers in soft sediments but some live in rock crevices. The head is conical or wedge-shaped and has no antennae. The body is generally cylindrical, tapering at both ends. Cirratulids are characterised by a large number of simple elongate filaments along the body. Some of these occur as an anterior cluster of tentacles, grooved for deposit-feeding, but the majority, the branchiae, are found one pair per segment, and do not have grooves. The chaetae (bristles) are simple capillaries, usually with hooks, and emerge directly from the body wall. There are no anal cirri (slender sensory appendages). The worm is usually buried with only the writhing branchial filaments visible. Some cirratulids can build tubes of calcium carbonate.

When alive, the body, branchiae and tentacular filaments are often red, orange or yellow, though species of Dodecaceria are dark green or black. Terebellidae and other worm families may superficially look similar to cirratulids with a mass of filaments. However, in terebellids, the filaments arise from the mouth or are restricted to the anterior three segments, whereas cirratulid branchiae occur throughout the body, one pair per segment.

Taxonomy
The genera are poorly defined and Blake undertook a partial revision in 1996. He divided them into three groups, the multi-tentaculate genera such as Cirratulus and Cirriformia, the bi-tentaculate soft-substrate genera such as Caulleriella, Chaetozone, Tharyx and the bi-tentaculate hard substrate genera such as Dodecaceria.

There is considerable confusion as to the phylogenetic relationships in the family and Blake suggests that many species with global distributions will be found to represent species complexes within which some species are presently undescribed.

Genera

 Ambo
 Aphelochaeta  Blake, 1991
 Caulleriella Chamberlin, 1919
 Chaetozone Malmgren, 1867
 Cirratulispio
 Cirratulus  Lamarck, 1801
 Cirrhatula
 Cirrhatulus
 Cirriformia  Hartman, 1936
 Dodecaceria  Örsted, 1843
 Heterocirrus  Grube, 1855
 Labranda
 Monticellina  Laubier, 1961
 Naraganseta
 Pentacirrus
 Promenia
 Protocirrineris  Czerniavsky, 1881
 Pseudocirratulus
 Tharyx  Webster & Benedict, 1887
 Timarete Kinberg, 1866
 Audouina Hartman, 1936
 Audouinia Quatrefages, 1865
 Cirrineris misspelling of Cirrhineris Blainville, 1828
 Cirrhineris Blainville, 1828 (nomen dubium)

References

Terebellida
Annelid families